Lieutenant Colonel Gijs Pepijn Tuinman,  (born Heerlen, 15 November 1979), is an officer of the Royal Netherlands Army. Tuinman is one of the only three living knights 4th class of the Military Order of William, the oldest and highest order of chivalry of the Kingdom of the Netherlands.

Life
Gijs Tuinman was born in 1979 in Heerlen, where he attended the Bernardinuscollege from 1992 to 1998. In 1998 he went to the Royal Military Academy in Breda. In 2001 he became a platoon commander in the Korps Commandotroepen to be. By 2009, he had been on at least five deployments to Afghanistan, several to Africa and other missions. On 7 October 2009, for a mission in 2006, he was awarded the Bronze Lion, the second highest military decoration awarded by Queen Beatrix of the Netherlands.

From 2009 to 2012, he was special operations policy adviser at the Ministry of Defence in The Hague. After this he was a 'citizen' consultant at Deloitte. He returned to military duty in 2013.

Military Order of William

On 4 December 2014 at The Binnenhof in The Hague, Tuinman was knighted by King Willem-Alexander of the Netherlands, receiving the fourth class' knighthood of the Military Order of William. 

The King referred to Tuinman and Epke Zonderland in his Christmas speech in 2014.

Decorations 
 Knight 4th class of the Military Order of William (RMWO)
 Bronze Lion
 Commemorative Medal Peacekeeping Operations
 Four Day Marches Cross 
 NATO Medal

References

Knights Fourth Class of the Military Order of William
Royal Netherlands Army officers
1979 births
Living people
People from Heerlen
Recipients of the Bronze Lion
Graduates of the Koninklijke Militaire Academie
20th-century Dutch military personnel
21st-century Dutch military personnel